The 1993–94 NBA season was the 6th season for the Charlotte Hornets in the National Basketball Association. During the off-season, the Hornets acquired Hersey Hawkins from the Philadelphia 76ers, and Eddie Johnson from the Seattle SuperSonics. Coming off their first playoff appearance, the Hornets won six of their first eight games as they played around .500 for the first half of the season. In December, the team traded Johnny Newman to the New Jersey Nets in exchange for Rumeal Robinson. However, the Hornets would soon struggle as Larry Johnson injured his back, and second-year star Alonzo Mourning was out with a torn calf muscle and sprained ankle.

Without their star players, the Hornets lost 16 of 17 games midway through the season, including two 8-game losing streaks between January and March, and held a 22–25 record at the All-Star break. At midseason, the team traded Mike Gminski to the Milwaukee Bucks in exchange for Frank Brickowski, and signed free agent Marty Conlon, but released him to free agency after 16 games, as he later on signed with the Washington Bullets. With the return of Johnson and Mourning, the Hornets won 18 of their final 26 games, and finished the season fifth in the Central Division with a 41–41 record. However, it was not enough as they narrowly missed out on a second straight playoff appearance, finishing just one game behind the 8th-seeded Miami Heat. The Hornets led the NBA in home-game attendance for the fifth time in six seasons.

Mourning averaged 21.5 points, 10.2 rebounds and 3.1 blocks per game in 60 games, and was selected for the 1994 NBA All-Star Game, but did not play due to being injured, while Johnson averaged 16.4 points and 8.8 rebounds per game in 51 games, and Dell Curry was named Sixth Man of the Year, averaging 16.3 points per game off the bench, and leading the team with 152 three-point field goals. In addition, Hawkins provided the team with 14.4 points and 1.6 steals per game, while Eddie Johnson contributed 11.5 points per game, and Muggsy Bogues provided with 10.8 points, 10.1 assists and 1.7 steals per game. 

Following the season, Eddie Johnson left to play overseas in Greece, while Brickowski signed as a free agent with the Sacramento Kings, and Robinson was released to free agency.

Draft picks

Roster

Regular season

Season standings

z - clinched division title
y - clinched division title
x - clinched playoff spot

Record vs. opponents

Game log

Player statistics

Awards and records
 Dell Curry, NBA Sixth Man of the Year Award

Transactions
 September 1, 1993

Traded Kendall Gill and a 1994 1st round draft pick (Carlos Rogers was later selected) to the Seattle SuperSonics for Dana Barros, Eddie Johnson and a 1994 1st round draft pick (Sharone Wright was later selected).
 September 3, 1993

Traded Dana Barros, Greg Graham, Sidney Green and a 1994 1st round draft pick (Sharone Wright was later selected) to the Philadelphia 76ers for Hersey Hawkins.
 September 23, 1993

Signed LeRon Ellis as a free agent.
 November 6, 1993

Signed Steve Henson as a free agent.
 December 10, 1993

Traded Johnny Newman to the New Jersey Nets for Rumeal Robinson.
 January 1, 1994

Signed Lorenzo Williams as a free agent.
 January 5, 1994

Waived Lorenzo Williams.
 February 2, 1994

Signed Marty Conlon to the first of two 10-day contracts.
 February 16, 1994

Signed Tim Kempton to the first of two 10-day contracts.
 February 24, 1994

Traded Mike Gminski and a 1997 1st round draft pick (Paul Grant was later selected) to the Milwaukee Bucks for Frank Brickowski.
 February 25, 1994

Signed Marty Conlon to a contract for the rest of the season.
 March 22, 1994

Waived Marty Conlon.
 March 24, 1994

Marty Conlon claimed on waivers by the Washington Bullets.

Player Transactions Citation:

References

See also
 1993-94 NBA season

Charlotte Hornets seasons
Char
Bob
Bob